Spirit  is an album by guitarist Preston Reed, released in 2007. It was the third release on Reed's own label.

Spirit is a departure from Reed's usual percussive style and focuses more on the style of jazz ballads.

Track listing
All songs by Preston Reed unless otherwise noted.
 "Street Beat" – 4:07
 "Gershwin" – 3:16
 "Sultry Wes" – 2:43
 "All The Things You Are" (Jerome Kern) – 1:52
 "Halflife" – 3:42
 "Spirit" – 3:40
 "Sunday Afternoon" – 4:24
 "Yellowjacket" – 4:00
 "The Sun Will Shine Again" – 2:36
 "Dance Of The Porcelain Dolls" – 2:53
 "Your Picture Here" – 3:16
 "Undiminished" – 2:55
 "Struttin'" – 3:12

Personnel
Preston Reed - acoustic guitar
Bill Shanley and Michael Manning - engineers
Ciarán Byrne - mastering
Eugene Donohoe - photography 
Simon Johns / Clear Sound & Vision - design and layout

References

2007 albums
Preston Reed albums